Yatawatte Purana Vihara (Sinhalaː යටවත්තේ පුරාණ විහාරය) (or Vidyaravinda Maha Pirivena) is an ancient Buddhist temple in Gampaha, Sri Lanka. The temple has been formally recognised by the Government as an archaeological site in Sri Lanka. The designation was declared on 15 April 2016 under the government Gazette number 1963.

The temple

Although the original construction date is not known, it is believed that the temple history is going back to the period of Kandyan Kingdom. The Tempita house of the Vihara is an archaeological protected monument which is believed to be constructed or renovated on 21 March 1861 as the date is indicated on its entrance door. Tempita houses are buildings constructed on granite pillars which were popular in Sri Lanka during the 17th-19th centuries.

References

External links

 අස්‌වැන්නෙහි ආරක්‍ෂකයා වූ ගම්පහ ටැම්පිට විහාර Divaina

Buddhist temples in Gampaha District
Archaeological protected monuments in Gampaha District